Bergen County Technical Schools (BCTS) is a county technical school district that serves as the vocational / technical education arm of all the school districts within the 70 municipalities in Bergen County, New Jersey, United States. The primary programs offered are the Bergen County Academies and Bergen County Technical High School. It has its headquarters in Paramus.

As of the 2019–20 school year, the district, comprised of five schools, had an enrollment of 2,245 students and 242.9 classroom teachers (on an FTE basis), for a student–teacher ratio of 9.2:1.

History
It was established in 1951.

In 1995 the administrations of this district and Bergen County Special Services School District combined with BCTS's administration team prevailing.

Awards and recognition
In 2015, Bergen County Academies was one of 15 schools in New Jersey, and one of nine public schools, recognized as a National Blue Ribbon School in the exemplary high performing category by the United States Department of Education.

For the 1997-98 school year, the Academy for the Advancement of Science and Technology of Bergen County Academies was named a "Star School" by the New Jersey Department of Education, the highest honor that a New Jersey school can achieve.

Schools

Schools in the district (with 2019–20 enrollment data from the National Center for Education Statistics) are:
Applied Technology High School (with 182 students in grades 9-12) focuses and offers hands on experiences in the engineering, healthcare, and cybersecurity field in its facility at Bergen Community College in Paramus. 
Bergen County Academies, Dr. John Grieco Campus (1,086 students in grades 9-12) offers seven public magnet high school programs. The Academies prepare students to meet the academic rigors of college and the corporate world beyond through a blend of professional, technical and academic courses.
Bergen County Technical High School, Paramus Campus (312 students in grades 9-12) is a shared-time vocational and technical training facility for Bergen County residents located in Paramus.
Bergen County Technical High School, Teterboro Campus (668 students in grades 9-12) is a full-time public high school that provides a challenging, project-driven curriculum in a technology-infused environment. The curriculum is structured around a core of interdisciplinary technical and academic disciplines that prepare students for post-secondary education and career development work-based experiences.

Athletics
Bergen Tech sports teams include athletes from all four campuses. The Bergen County Technical High School Knights now competes in the Big North Conference, following a reorganization of sports leagues in Northern New Jersey by the New Jersey State Interscholastic Athletic Association. In the 2009-10 school year, the school competed in the North Jersey Tri-County Conference, which was established on an interim basis to facilitate the realignment. Prior to the realignment, the teams had previously competed in the Northern New Jersey Interscholastic League (NNJIL), starting with the 2006-07 school year. With 1,571 students in grades 10-12, Bergen Tech was classified by the NJSIAA for the 2015-16 school year as North I, Group IV for most athletic competition purposes, which included schools with an enrollment of 1,090 to 2,568 students in that grade range.

In 2006, the Bergen Tech football team won their first NNJIL Division Championship. They also participated in the state playoffs for the first time in the school's history. They lost in the first round to Randolph High School by a score of 29-0.

In 2007, the girls' tennis team won the North I, Group IV state sectional championship with a 4-1 win over Ridgewood High School in the tournament finals. The win was the team's second consecutive title, and their third since 2003.

Administration
Core members of the district's administration are:
Howard Lerner, Superintendent
John Susino, Business Administrator / Board Secretary

Board of education
The district's board of education is comprised of five members. Four of the members are appointed by the Bergen County Executive after confirmation by the Board of Commissioners, with each member serving a four-year term. The other member is the County Superintendent of Schools.

References

External links
Bergen County Technical Schools

Data for the Bergen County Technical Schools, National Center for Education Statistics

Educational institutions accredited by the Council on Occupational Education
Paramus, New Jersey
School districts in Bergen County, New Jersey
Vocational school districts in New Jersey
1951 establishments in New Jersey
Educational institutions established in 1951